Francisco 'Fran' de Paula Pablo Cruz Torres (born 22 June 1991) is a Spanish footballer who plays as a central defender for Cultural y Deportiva Leonesa.

Club career
Born in Córdoba, Andalusia, Cruz finished his development with local Córdoba CF, making his senior debut with the reserves in 2008–09. His first competitive appearance with the first team took place on 6 January 2013, in a 0–0 away draw against CD Mirandés in the Segunda División.

Cruz played 32 matches during the 2013–14 season, in a promotion to La Liga after a 42-year absence. On 15 July 2014 he renewed his contract with the club for three seasons, and was immediately loaned to AD Alcorcón also in the second division.

In late August 2015, Cruz cut ties with Córdoba and moved to fellow league team UE Llagostera. He spent the following years in the same tier, representing Mirandés, Lorca FC and Extremadura UD, aside from a six-month spell at Miedź Legnica in the Polish Ekstraklasa and an even shorter stint with Romania's FC Rapid București.

Personal life
Cruz's younger brother, Bernardo, was also a footballer and a defender. Both were groomed at Córdoba.

Career statistics

Club

References

External links

1991 births
Living people
Spanish footballers
Footballers from Córdoba, Spain
Association football defenders
Segunda División players
Tercera División players
Primera Federación players
Córdoba CF B players
Córdoba CF players
AD Alcorcón footballers
UE Costa Brava players
CD Mirandés footballers
Lorca FC players
Extremadura UD footballers
Cultural Leonesa footballers
Liga II players
FC Rapid București players
Ekstraklasa players
Miedź Legnica players
Spanish expatriate footballers
Expatriate footballers in Romania
Expatriate footballers in Poland
Spanish expatriate sportspeople in Romania
Spanish expatriate sportspeople in Poland